Varzesh 3, is an Iranian sports news website that was launched in 2010.

This site includes: sports news, ranking leagues, popular tournaments, Live streaming and live results of world games, sports videos, sports newspapers, Pictures of players and predictions and created. Varzesh 3 is the fourth most visited website in Iran and the most visited Iranian sports website based on Alexa Internet.

References

Association football websites
Iranian news websites